"The Girls from Ames" is a group of women from Ames, Iowa who were the subject of Jeffrey Zaslow's 2009 nonfiction bestseller about lifelong friendships. 

In the book, Zaslow chronicled eleven childhood friends who formed a special bond growing up in Ames. After college, they moved to eight different states, yet managed to maintain an enduring friendship that would carry them through college and careers, marriage and motherhood, dating and divorce, a child's illness and the mysterious death of one member of their group. 

At the time of Zaslow's writing, the women were in their mid-forties. Jenny Litchman was assistant dean at the University of Maryland School of Medicine. Kelly Zwagerman and Sally Hamilton were teachers in Minnesota and Iowa. Cathy Highland was a makeup artist in Los Angeles. Karen Leininger, Karla Blackwood and Marilyn Johnson were stay-at-home moms in Pennsylvania, Montana and Minnesota. Diana Sarussi, once a CPA, worked at a Starbucks in Arizona. Jane Nash was a psychology professor in Massachusetts. Angela Jamison owned a public-relations firm in North Carolina.

References

External links
 The Girls from Ames

Ames, Iowa
People from Ames, Iowa
Women in Iowa